Rangiora High School is a state co-educational secondary school located in Rangiora, New Zealand. Established in 1881  by an act of parliament and opened in 1884, the school has a roll of  students from years 9 to 13 (approx. ages 12 to 18) as of

Enrolment
Rangiora High School operates an enrolment scheme to help curb roll numbers and prevent overcrowding. The school's home zone, in which students residing are automatically entitled to be enrolled, covers much of the central Waimakariri District and the southern Hurunui District. Students residing outside the zone are sometimes accepted, as roll places allow in accordance with the enrolment scheme order of preference.

At the March 2012 Education Review Office (ERO) review of the school, the school had 1789 students enrolled, including 44 international students. The school roll's gender composition was 49% male and 51% female, and its ethnic composition was 85% New Zealand European (Pākehā), 10% Māori, 3% Asian and 2% other.

The school has a socio-economic decile rating of 9 (step Q), meaning it draws its school community from areas of low to moderately-low socio-economic disadvantage when compared to other New Zealand schools. The current decile came into force in January 2015, after a nationwide review of deciles following the 2013 census. Previously, the school had a decile of 8 (step P).

Curriculum
Rangiora High School has developed a junior curriculum based on the New Zealand Curriculum. In Years 9 and 10 students study Ako, a connected curriculum model which includes English, Mathematics, Science, Social Studies, and Health & Physical Education. Year 9 students also select four half-year elective subjects, which must include one Arts subject, one Technology subject and one Language subject (out of French, Japanese, and Te Reo Māori). Year 10 students also select four half-year electives.

In Years 11 to 13, students complete the National Certificate of Educational Achievement (NCEA), the main secondary school qualification in New Zealand. Levels 1, 2 and 3 of NCEA are usually completed in Years 11, 12 and 13 respectively, although students can choose subjects from different levels depending on their progress through the NCEA level system. In Year 11, students study English, Mathematics, Science or Agricultural Science, and three full-year elective subjects. Students in Year 12 study six full-year elective subjects. Students in Year 13 study five full-year elective subjects, with study for an additional four periods per week. Because the 25-period-per-week school timetable is not evenly divisible into six subject lines, students in Years 11 to 13 spend the last period on Wednesdays either in supervised study or sport practice.

Rangiora High School has a school farm, which is used to teach land-based studies. Set up in 1910, it started out running stock and growing crops, before being officially opened in November 1930 by Lord Bledisloe, the then Governor-General.

In 2013, 89.0 percent of students leaving Rangiora High held at least NCEA Level 1, 81.4 percent held at least NCEA Level 2, and 49.9 percent held at least University Entrance. This is compared to 85.2%, 74.2%, and 49.0% respectively for all students nationally.

Co-curricular

School houses
Rangiora High School is divided into six houses, each containing approximately 300 students and 25 staff. Houses also provide a basis for inter-house competition in sport and cultural activities. The houses are named for New Zealanders who have achieved distinction in their respective areas. They are:
 Hillary (red), named after mountaineer Sir Edmund Hillary
 Lydiard (orange), named after athlete Arthur Lydiard
 Mansfield (yellow), named after author Katherine Mansfield
 Ngata (green), named after politician and lawyer Sir Āpirana Ngata
 Rutherford (blue), named after scientist Lord Ernest Rutherford
 Sheppard (white), named after suffragist Kate Sheppard

Staff

Rangiora High School has 117 teaching and strategic leadership staff and more than 50 support staff .

Principals
Since its opening in 1884, Rangiora High School has been led by the following principals:
1884–1886: Rev. Henry E. Tuckey
1886–1893: Mr Thomas W. Rowe
1893–1898: Rev. G. I. Sim
1899–1917: Mr Thomas R. Cresswell
1917–1948: Mr James E. Strachan
1949–1963: Mr Joe Moffat
1964–1978: Mr Tom Penny
1979–1989: Mr Colin Macintosh
1989–2002: Mr Peter Allen
2003–2016: Mrs Peggy Burrows
2017–2022: Ms Karen Stewart
2022–present: Mr Bruce Kearney

Notable alumni

Notable former students of Rangiora High School include:

 Todd Blackadder – rugby union player and coach, All Black (1995–2000, including captain 1997–2000)
 Sir Malcolm McRae Burns  – agricultural scientist, principal of Lincoln College (later Lincoln University) and President of the Royal Society of New Zealand
 Ron Chippindale – aviation accident investigator, Chief Inspector of the Office of Air Accident Investigations (1975–90) and the Transport Accident Investigation Commission (1990–98)
Emma Cropper – Newshub journalist
 Berkeley Dallard – Under-Secretary of the Department of Justice, Controller-General of Prisons
 Margaret Dalziel
 Brian Ford – rugby union player, All Black (1977–79)
 Tony Hawke – Canterbury Rams basketball player
 Gemma Hazeldine – netball player
 Hon Rodney Hide  – politician, former ACT Party leader, Cabinet Minister, MP for Epsom 1996-2011
 Graeme Higginson – rugby union player, All Black (1980–83)
 The Most Reverend Bishop Edward Joyce – Bishop of the Roman Catholic Diocese of Christchurch (1950-1964)
 Tutehounuku "Nuk" Korako – politician
 Ian MacRae – rugby union player
 Brigadier Reginald Miles  – military leader, prisoner of war
 Fletcher Newell – rugby union player, All Black
 Guy Newton – flying ace of the Royal New Zealand Air Force
 Angie Petty ( Smit) – athlete
Tim Price – New Zealand representative eventer
 Gabi Rennie – footballer
 Ian Sinclair – test cricketer (1956)
 Nick Smith  – politician, cabinet minister, MP for Tasman/Nelson (1990–2020)
 Barry Thompson – rugby union player, politician
 Whetu Tirikatene-Sullivan  ( Tirikatene) – politician, cabinet minister, MP for Southern Maori 1967-96	
 Henare Uru – MP for Southern Maori (1922–28)
 Dr J. Morgan Williams – Parliamentary Commissioner for the Environment (1997-2007)
 Donna Wilkins ( Loffhagen) – Silver Fern player and Tall Fern captain

Giant redwood
A giant redwood tree is in the grounds of the school. It was planted in 1887 to mark Queen Victoria's Diamond Jubilee and has now grown into a very large tree.

References

External links

Education Review Office (ERO) reports
2016–2019 Charter

Secondary schools in Canterbury, New Zealand
Educational institutions established in 1881
1881 establishments in New Zealand
Rangiora